A pendant is a piece of jewellery.

Pendant may also refer to:

Ships and aircraft 
Arresting gear, which use deck pendant cables to rapidly decelerate an aircraft as it lands on an aircraft carrier
 Nautical pendant, a length of cable or rope with eyes or fittings at the ends for attachment to vessels, bollards or buoys
Pennant number, previously called a pendant number, a British Navy and Commonwealth system for classifying warships
Pennon (or pennant), a narrow, tapering flag commonly flown by ships at sea:
 Pennant (commissioning), the traditional sign of a warship, flown from its masthead while the ship is in commission
 Broad pennant, flown from the masthead of a Royal Navy ship to indicate the presence of a commodore on board
 Pennant (church), flown by navies during services on board ships

The arts 
 Pendant (art), paintings, sculptures, or other works of art intended as a pair
 Pendant (musician), Brian Leeds (born 1991), American electronic musician 
 Pendant vault, a late Gothic architecture vault

Other uses 
 Pendant bar, a fluvial landform
 Pendant group, a group of molecules attached to a backbone chain of a long molecule
 Pendant light, a type of light fixture
 Pendant vertex, a vertex whose neighbourhood contains exactly one vertex
 Roof pendant, in structural geology, a mass of country rock that projects downward into an igneous intrusion

See also
 Pendent (the adjectival form)